NASCAR Racing 4 is a racing simulator produced by Papyrus and released in February 2001.

Gameplay
The game was a huge step forward over its predecessor and addressed many requested features for the game. Namely was the introduction of full 24-bit color, as the previous games had only allowed 256, vastly improved car models and environments and, for the first time, the ability of the car to rotate in three dimensions (i.e. the ability of the car to get airborne and flip). The simulator also continued the increased efforts to reflect the aspects of driving a real car.

This was the first version of the game since NASCAR Racing 2 to have actual car manufacturers represented. Additionally, it was the first version of the game to feature the ability to race a full 43 car field. It was the first installment in the "NASCAR Racing" series to include Daytona International Speedway, and included all 21 tracks that were raced in Winston Cup in 2000. It included 25 of the drivers and teams anticipated to run the 2001 season, including Dale Earnhardt as the game was released 12 days before his fatal crash, as well as 42 fictional drivers and teams, most of which carried fictional sponsors or are sponsored by a Sierra company. The inclusion of Sierra affiliate-sponsored cars was a trend that began as early as NASCAR Racing 1999 Edition, where a fantasy truck driver sponsored by Davidson & Associates is present.

As with previous titles in the series, included are the options of testing, single race weekend, championship, and online multiplayer hosted by Sierra servers or a third-party client. In addition, a more detailed paint shop can be accessed via the opponent manager menu, which allows for custom paint schemes and, for the first time, custom pit crew uniforms, to be imported and exported from the game. A replay viewer is also included so the player can view their saved session replays.

NASCAR Racing 4 was followed by NASCAR Racing 2002 Season.

Reception

In the United States, NASCAR Racing 4 sold 260,000 copies and earned $10.4 million by August 2006, after its release in February 2001. It was the country's 76th best-selling computer game between January 2000 and August 2006. Combined sales of all NASCAR Racing computer games released between January 2000 and August 2006 had reached 900,000 in the United States by the latter date. The game was received highly positive by critics. It has a Metacritic score of 89% based on 14 critic reviews.

Computer Games Magazine and PC Gamer US both named NASCAR Racing 4 the best racing game of 2001; the former publication's editors called it "the crown King" of its genre. It was also a nominee for Computer Gaming Worlds 2001 "Best Simulation Game" award, which ultimately went to IL-2 Sturmovik.

References

External links 
NASCAR Racing 4 at MobyGames

2001 video games
NASCAR video games
Papyrus Design Group games
Racing simulators
Racing video games
Sierra Entertainment games
Windows games
Windows-only games
Simulation video games
Video games developed in the United States
Multiplayer and single-player video games